Opinion polling (locally known as "surveys") is carried out by two major polling firms: Social Weather Stations (SWS), and Pulse Asia, with a handful of minor polling firms.

The Philippines uses plurality-at-large voting for senate elections. A voter has up to 12 votes, with the twelve candidates with the highest number of votes being elected. Political parties produce tickets; if their slate fail to reach 12 members, they may recruit other candidates from other parties as guest candidates; these guest candidates are not obliged to follow the policies of the slates that adopted them. Each candidate may be a member of different slates.

A typical poll asks a person to name twelve persons one would vote for in the senate election. A pollster then ranks all candidates from highest to lowest; the candidates at the top 12 are deemed "safe", while those below the top 12 but whose margin of error is within the 12th placed candidate's figure are "statistically tied" with the 12th placed candidate. In this system, a pollster can determine how many seats each ticket can win since the entire country is a single at-large "district"; this is unlike polling in other countries not using proportional representation for elections in legislatures where while a poll may give how a party may perform in the national vote but the number of seats that could have won is otherwise distorted due to the way the districts are drawn or to local variations.

Winning candidates

Seats won
Candidates who were not make it to the top 12, but were within the margin of error from the 12th-placed candidate, are denoted by figures inside the parenthesis.

References

2007 Philippine general election
2007
Philippines